Salis-Soglio can refer to:
 Jerome de Salis-Soglio, 2nd Count de Salis-Soglio
 Jerome, 4th Count de Salis-Soglio
 Peter, 5th Count de Salis-Soglio
 John Francis William, 6th Count de Salis-Soglio
 John Francis Charles, 7th Count de Salis-Soglio

See also
 De Salis (disambiguation)